Mozambique competed in the Olympic Games for the first time at the 1980 Summer Olympics in Moscow, USSR.

Athletics

Men
Track & road events

Field events

Women
Track & road events

Field events

Swimming

Men

References
Official Olympic Reports

Nations at the 1980 Summer Olympics
1980
Oly